Nikola Marjanović (10 October 1905 – 6 March 1983) was a Serbian football player and manager.

Early life
Marjanović was born in Belgrade to a merchant father Dimitrije and housewife mother Sofija. He grew up on the outskirts of Belgrade in 7 Đakovačka Street with his younger brother Blagoje "Moša".

Playing career

Club career
He started his career in 1920 with SK Jugoslavija, where he played until 1924, when he moved to BSK Beograd and remained there until 1936. With BSK, he won four national championship titles (1931, 1933, 1935 and 1936).

International career
He was a non-playing member of the Kingdom of Yugoslavia national team (then known officially as the Kingdom of Serbs, Croats and Slovenes) at the 1928 Summer Olympics. He made his first and only appearance for the Kingdom of Yugoslavia on 3 April 1933 against Spain in Belgrade, when he replaced Svetislav Valjarević in the 40th minute.

Post-playing career
He also worked as a coach, leading the youth of Partizan and Rad. He finished his sports career in 1940. As an employee of the Belgrade Electric Central, he retired on 1 May 1962.

References

External links
 
 Nikola Marjanović at Reprezentacija.rs

1905 births
1983 deaths
Footballers from Belgrade
Yugoslav footballers
Serbian footballers
OFK Beograd players
Yugoslav football managers
Serbian football managers
Yugoslavia international footballers
Olympic footballers of Yugoslavia
Footballers at the 1928 Summer Olympics
Yugoslav First League players
Association football forwards
FK Partizan non-playing staff